Solid light, often referred to in media as "hard light" or "hard-light", is a hypothetical material, made of light in a solidified state. It has been theorized that this could exist, and experiments claim to have created solid photonic matter or molecules by inducing strong interaction between photons. Potential applications of this could include logic gates for quantum computers and room-temperature superconductor development.

Experiments
In theory, photons, the particles that make up forms of electromagnetic radiation like light, may be attracted in a nonlinear medium.

The MIT-Harvard Center for Ultracold Atoms conducted experiments in the 2010s. Single photons were fired from weak lasers into a dense cloud of rubidium cooled to near absolute zero. The speed of light in the cloud was about 100,000 times slower than in a vacuum. Within the cloud, photons lost energy and gained mass. The conditions allowed photons to attract and bind to other photons, and exit the cloud as molecules. Reportedly, photon pairs were observed in 2013, and triplets in 2018.

Fiction 
Solid light appears in many video game franchises, including Halo, Portal, Destiny and Overwatch. In Portal 2 sunlight is used to create hard light bridges, which act as solid semi-translucent walkways or barriers. In Overwatch a fictional company called Vishkar uses solid light to create cities and make bridges, turrets, portals, shield generators, barriers and weaponry.

Solid holograms appear in many works in the Star Trek media franchise. In "Red Dwarf", the character Rimmer is a hologram who obtains a hard light drive, allowing him to touch and feel while being almost indestructible. In Steven Universe, the Gems are a fictional alien race consisting of magical gemstones that project humanoid physical bodies made of solid light. In the webseries RWBY, the character Velvet Scarlatina uses a handheld camera to 3D print photographed weapons, made out of hard-light Dust. In DC Comics's Green Lantern, the various Lantern Corps use solid light constructs. It is also portrayed in The Lightbringer series by fantasy author Brent Weeks , in Ms. Marvel  and in Dr. Strange.

See also
 Jaynes–Cummings model
 Macroscopic quantum self-trapping

References 

Fictional materials
Light
Photonics
Quantum optics
Phase transitions